Zanthoxylum zanthoxyloides, also called Senegal prickly-ash or artar root, is a plant species in the genus Zanthoxylum.

The plant contains isomeric divanilloylquinic acids (3,4-O-divanilloylquinic acid or burkinabin A, 3,5-O-divanilloylquinic acid or burkinabin B and 4,5-O-divanilloylquinic acid or burkinabin C). Burkinabin C, a type of hydrolysable tannin can be found in the root bark of F. zanthoxyloides. It also contains fagaronine, a benzophenanthridine alkaloid.

A study by Williams, Soelberg and Jäger (2016) showed than ethanolic extracts of Z. zanthoxyloides have in vitro anthelmintic properties against the nematode Ascaris suum, a swine parasite that is closely related to the human parasite A. lumbricoides. The half maximal effective concentration (EC50) values were 94 μg/mL and 132 μg/mL, for roots and root bark, respectively. The authors concluded that these results encourage further investigation of the use of this plant as complementary treatment options for ascariasis.

References

External links

Plants described in 1981
zanthoxyloides